Converge, formerly the Baptist General Conference (BGC) and Converge Worldwide, is an evangelical Baptist Christian denomination of the Swedish Baptist and Radical Pietist tradition in the United States that emerged out of Lutheranism. The denomination as an institution emerged in the late 19th Century. It is affiliated with the Baptist World Alliance and the National Association of Evangelicals. The headquarters is in Orlando. The current president of Converge is John K. Jenkins.

The Baptist General Conference adopted the new movement name of Converge Worldwide in 2008, and was renamed to Converge in 2015.

History
The Baptist General Conference grew out of the great revival of the 19th century, but its roots can be traced back to Radical Pietism in Sweden. In 1852 Gustaf Palmquist emigrated from Sweden to the United States. Forty-seven days after his arrival, he and three others organized a Swedish Baptist church in Rock Island, Illinois. Fredrik (F.O.) Nilsson, who was instrumental in leading Palmquist to Baptist views, arrived in America the next year with 21 immigrants. Some of these united with the Rock Island church, while others organized a church at Houston, Minnesota. Nilsson traveled widely, founding and strengthening churches. Anders Wiberg was another pioneer among these churches from 1852 until 1855, when he returned to Sweden as a missionary. It also had influence from and a partial connection with fellow Pietists and Radical Pietists of different denominational traditions within the Mission Friends movement.   

Christian experience was a major emphasis among these Swedish Baptists, and they prospered from the awakenings in the 19th century. Immigration, aggressive evangelism and conversion through revivals brought rapid growth to the denomination. John Alexis Edgren founded the Swedish Baptist Seminary in  Chicago, Illinois in 1871. 

In 1879, when the Swedish churches had grown to 65 in number, they formed a General Conference. The members of these churches assimilated into American society and gradually lost their separate ethnic identity. By 1940, most churches were English-speaking. In 1945, the Swedish Baptist General Conference dropped "Swedish" from its name and became the Baptist General Conference of America. Swedish Baptists had maintained an alliance with the American Baptist Publication Society, American Baptist home and foreign missions, etc., and later the Northern Baptist Convention. Some Swedish Baptists expected to merge with that body, but the groups moved toward different developments of theological emphasis. The conservative Swedish Baptists pulled back from growing liberalism of the Northern Baptists, and in 1944 formed their own Board of Foreign Missions. This moved them toward independent existence, which they have maintained to the present. From its beginning among Scandinavian immigrants, the BGC has grown to a nationwide association of autonomous churches with at least 17 ethnic groups and missions in 35 nations.

Statistics
According to a denomination census released in 2020, it claimed 1,312 churches and 322,293 members.

Beliefs 
The Convention has a Baptist confession of faith. It is a member of the Baptist World Alliance.

Seminaries
Converge operates the Bethel Theological Seminary and Bethel University in Arden Hills, Minnesota near St. Paul, and maintains business offices in Arlington Heights, Illinois.

Notable Members 

 John Piper - theologian, professor of biblical studies at Bethel University, and pastor at Bethlehem Baptist Church (Minneapolis).

References

Sources
Glenmary Research Center. Religious Congregations & Membership in the United States, 2000
McBeth, H. Leon. The Baptist Heritage: Four Centuries of Baptist Witness
Olson, Adolf. A Centenary History as Related to the Baptist General Conference
Wardin, Albert W. Jr. Baptists Around the World

External links
Converge - official website

Religious organizations established in 1879
Members of the National Association of Evangelicals
Baptist denominations in the United States
Radical Pietism
Baptist denominations established in the 19th century
Evangelical denominations in North America